Cammarata is a comune (municipality) in the Province of Agrigento in the Italian region Sicily, located about  southeast of Palermo and about  north of Agrigento on the eponymous mountain, which has an elevation  above sea level in a territory rich in forests.

Cammarata borders the following municipalities: Acquaviva Platani, Casteltermini, Castronovo di Sicilia, Mussomeli, San Giovanni Gemini, Santo Stefano Quisquina, Vallelunga Pratameno, Villalba.

History
The name derives from the Greek Kàmara, meaning "vaulted room".

King Roger I laid siege to the Cammarata in 1087 and sold it to a relative Lucia d'Altavilla (or in English Lucy of Hauteville).  She then assumed the title Dominae Camaratae or Lucy of Cammarata for the town she was given

The town is mentioned in 1141 in a document mentioning several Arabic localities, a sign that it was settled at least from the Islamic domination of the island.

The county of Cammarata followed the history of Sicily under the Normans, the Hohenstaufen and the War of the Vespers. In 1397 the count rebelled and the town was besieged by Bernardo Cabrera, general of king Martin II of Sicily. Later it was a fief of the Abatellis.

Main sights

The castle, an example of Aragonese architecture

References

External links
 Official website

Cities and towns in Sicily